Jersey Shore is an American reality television series that ran on MTV from December 3, 2009 to December 20, 2012 in the United States. The series follows the lives of eight housemates: Jenni Farley, Michael "The Situation" Sorrentino, Nicole "Snooki" Polizzi, Paul "Pauly D" DelVecchio, Ronnie Ortiz-Magro, Sammi Giancola, Vinny Guadagnino, Deena Nicole Cortese (seasons 3–6), and Angelina Pivarnick (seasons 1–2).

The first season had five special episodes, with some airing after select episodes. Several after-hours specials have aired on MTV following select episodes along with various specials. The end of each season has been accompanied by a reunion show. Also a number of after-show internet specials titled "Jersey Shore: Hook-Up" hosted by Kenny Santucci have been released on MTV.com after select episodes. Additionally, there have been a number of internet specials exclusively on MTV.com.

Series overview

Episodes

Season 1 (2009–10)
For the first quarter of 2010, season 1 of Jersey Shore was the highest-rated original cable series among 12- to 34-year-olds, with a season-high 2.6 rating for the finale. The season also ranked #1 for its time period versus all cable competition among 12- to 34-year-olds. The season finale was MTV's highest-rated original series telecast in almost two years.  Overall, the season averaged 2.7 million viewers. The season featured five special episodes, including a half-hour show titled Jersey Shore: After Hours hosted by Julissa Bermudez which aired occasionally after select episodes featuring cast members discussing the week's episode.

 Episodes 1.01 and 1.02 premiered back-to-back. Episodes 1.07 and 1.08 aired back-to-back.

Season 2 (2010)
On January 29, 2010, MTV announced that a second season of the series consisting of 13 episodes had been ordered and would air in Summer 2010. MTV announced that the second season would follow all of the first-season cast as they "escape the cold northeast and find themselves in a new destination". The second season was shot in the South Beach neighborhood of Miami Beach, Florida from early March to late May 2010. The second season began on July 29, 2010. For Season 2, the After Hours specials were expanded to one hour and received Top 15 Weekly Cable ratings. Like season 1, this season featured special episodes titled Jersey Shore: Hook-Up. Like Season 1's episodes, these are hosted by Kenny Santucci from the Real World/Road Rules Challenge: Fresh Meat and shown on MTV.com.

Aired on a Sunday night at 7 p.m. ET before the 2010 MTV Video Music Awards.
MTV did not re-air the episode on TV or online after the initial showing until its usual time-slot the following Thursday September 16, 2010. Upon re-airing, the episode received 3.75 million viewers.

Season 3 (2011)

Season 3 was shot back in Seaside Heights, New Jersey over the summer; filming began on July 25, 2010 and ended on September 4, 2010. On July 20, 2010, MTV announced that the entire cast will return for the third season, with the exception of Angelina Pivarnick. Angelina was replaced by Deena Nicole Cortese, a longtime friend of Nicole "Snooki" Polizzi and a self-described "blast in a glass".

Although the season is widely reported and regarded as the third season of the show, MTV refers to it as a continuation of season 2 on their website. Season three premiered on January 6, 2011 to 8.45 million viewers, making it MTV's highest-rated telecast. The second episode of the season once again set a series and MTV high, with 8.56 million viewers, only to set another record with the airing of the fourth episode, which garnered 8.87 million viewers.

Episode aired on a Monday night at 9 p.m. ET before the series premiere of Skins.

Season 4 (2011)
MTV renewed Jersey Shore for a fourth season on January 24, 2011. It was the first to be shot overseas, this time following the cast in Florence, Italy. Filming went from May to June 20, 2011 and the fourth season premiered on August 4, 2011. The fourth season aired for 12 episodes and finished airing on October 20, 2011.

Season 5 (2012)
Jersey Shore was renewed for a fifth season. Filming started a week after returning from Italy on June 27th, 2011 to August 1st, 2011. It premiered on January 5, 2012 and follows the cast returning to Seaside Heights, New Jersey after spending the fourth season in Italy.

Season 6 (2012)
On March 19, 2012, MTV confirmed that the series would return for a sixth season at Seaside Heights, with the whole cast returning. Snooki, being pregnant, lived next door to the shore house.  On August 30, 2012 it was confirmed that Season 6 would be the final season of the show. Jersey Shore Season 6: The Uncensored Final Season was released on DVD, March 19, 2013.

References

Lists of American reality television series episodes